Manfred Zetzsche (born 10 February 1930 in Altenburg) is a German actor.

Selected filmography
 Johannes Kepler (1974)
 Between Day and Night (1975)
 Where Others Keep Silent (1984)

Bibliography
 Frank-Burkhard Habel and Volker Wachter: Das große Lexikon der DDR-Stars. Schwarzkopf & Schwarzkopf, Berlin 2002, .

External links
 

1930 births
Living people
People from Altenburg
German male film actors
East German actors